James Omar Cole House, also known as the Cole House, is a historic home located at Peru, Miami County, Indiana, United States.  It was built about 1883, as a -story, Second Empire style brick dwelling.  It has a square plan with two projecting bays and a mansard roof with dormers.

It was listed on the National Register of Historic Places in 1984.

References

Houses on the National Register of Historic Places in Indiana
Second Empire architecture in Indiana
Houses completed in 1883
Buildings and structures in Miami County, Indiana
National Register of Historic Places in Miami County, Indiana